It's Alive is the first live album by the American punk rock band the Ramones, titled after the 1974 horror film of the same name. It was recorded at the Rainbow Theatre in London on December 31, 1977, and released in April 1979 as a 2-LP set. The album draws from the band's first three studio albums: Ramones (1976), Leave Home (1977), and Rocket to Russia (1977). Four concerts during the UK tour were recorded, but the New Year's Eve one was chosen because ten rows of seats were thrown at the stage after the concert and it was considered the best of the performances at the venue. 

The album and concert is referred to as the band at its live peak. The concert was filmed and later released in truncated form on the 2007 compilation DVD It's Alive 1974-1996. The album was certified gold in Argentina in 1993.

Critical reception

In a 1996 retrospective review, Robert Christgau of The Village Voice wrote: "Redundant when it was dropped on the punk-besotted U.K. in 1979, this concert is precious history now—seems so impossibly light and quick it makes you suspect they didn't fully sustain their live pace into their forties after all." 

Paul Rigby of Record Collector described the album as a "high energy, one-hour blitz" that attests to "how high-octane they really were".

AllMusic critic Mark Deming deemed It's Alive to be "not only the best Ramones live album," but also "one of the best and most effective live albums in the rock canon, and every bit as essential as Ramones, Leave Home, or Rocket to Russia." 

In 2005, It's Alive was ranked number 279 in Rock Hard magazine's book The 500 Greatest Rock & Metal Albums of All Time.

Track listing

Release history 
It's Alive was first released on CD in the US in 1995. The album was reissued as a 4 CD/2 LP 40th Anniversary Deluxe Edition on September 20, 2019, limited to 8,000 copies. The set includes all four concerts that were recorded during the Ramones' UK tour in December 1977 and is housed in a 12x12 hardcover book, with liner notes written by Steve Albini and Ed Stasium.

Personnel

Ramones
Joey Ramone - lead vocals
Johnny Ramone - guitar
Dee Dee Ramone - bass, backing vocals
Tommy Ramone - drums

Production
Ed Stasium - engineer
Tommy Ramone, Ed Stasium - producers
Basing Street Studios Ltd. - mobile recording facilities
Greb Cobb, Frank Owen, Jo Yu, Ray Doyle - mobile crew
Ramona Janquito, Phil Shrago - studio crew
Monte Melnick - tour manager
Arturo Vega - lighting
Tasco - sound, lighting

Album Design-Spencer Drate
Art Director-John Gillespie
Photography-Various Photographers

Charts

Certifications

References 

1979 live albums
Ramones live albums
Sire Records live albums
Albums produced by Tommy Ramone
albums produced by Ed Stasium